William Thomas Straith (August 5, 1894 – March 27, 1980) was a lawyer and political figure in British Columbia. He represented Victoria City in the Legislative Assembly of British Columbia from 1937 to 1953 as a Liberal.

He was born in Innerkip, Ontario, in 1894, the son of Reverend Peter Straith and Janet Martin, and was educated in Mount Forest and at the University of Manitoba. Straith was called to the British Columbia bar in 1922. In 1924, he married Alice Mae Stokes. Straith was an alderman for Victoria City Council from 1928 to 1931 and in 1935. He ran unsuccessfully for a seat in the assembly in 1928. Straith served in the provincial cabinet as Minister of Education. In 1939, he co-founded the legal firm Straith Pringle & Ruttan. After he left politics, Straith continued to practise law until his death in 1980.

References 

1904 births
1980 deaths
British Columbia Liberal Party MLAs
Victoria, British Columbia city councillors